Hebrews 3 is the third chapter of the Epistle to the Hebrews in the New Testament of the Christian Bible. The author is anonymous, although the internal reference to "our brother Timothy" (Hebrews 13:23) causes a traditional attribution to Paul, but this attribution has been disputed since the second century and there is no decisive evidence for the authorship. This chapter contains the comparison of Moses to Jesus ('the Son'), as well as the application and warning for the congregation.

Text
The original text was written in Koine Greek. This chapter is divided into 19 verses.

Textual witnesses
Some early manuscripts containing the text of this chapter are:
Papyrus 46 (c. 175–225; complete)
Papyrus 13 (225-250; complete)
Codex Vaticanus (325-350)
Codex Sinaiticus (330-360)
Codex Alexandrinus (400-440)
Codex Ephraemi Rescriptus (~450; complete)
Codex Freerianus (~450; extant verse 4–6, 14–16)
Codex Claromontanus (~550)
Codex Coislinianus (~550; extant verse 13–18)
Papyrus 116 (6th century; extant verse 3–6)

Old Testament references
 : Psalm 
 : 
 :

Moses and Jesus as Examples of Faith (3:1–6)
The faithfulness of Jesus to God as the one who appointed him is paralleled with the faithfulness of Moses, inviting us to completely trust Jesus.

Verse 1
 Therefore, holy brethren, partakers of the heavenly calling, consider the Apostle and High Priest of our confession, Christ Jesus,
"Holy brethren": or "holy brothers" suggests a family relationship between true believers, both men and women, as 'pilgrims' who share in the heavenly calling to reign with Jesus Christ in 'the world to come'.

Verse 2
 who was faithful to Him who appointed Him, as Moses also was faithful in all His house.
Moses' foundational role as the revealer of God's will to Israel is highlighted.

Verse 3
 For this One has been counted worthy of more glory than Moses, inasmuch as He who built the house has more honor than the house.
"The house": is rendered in Arabic version "the temple", may refer to  pointing to Christ who is the builder, foundation, and cornerstone of "the church", from where he has a glory.

A call to faithfulness (3:7–19)
The Holy Spirit, who is acknowledged as the one spoken 'through David' in Psalm 95 (3:7; 4:7), continues to speak to generations of Christians and warn them to 'make each day a fresh 'Today' to hear his voice and live'.

Verse 13
But exhort one another daily, while it is called “Today,” lest any of you be hardened through the deceitfulness of sin.
"While it is called "Today": that is, 'while the "to-day" lasts', referring to "the day of grace" (before the arrival of the day of glory and judgment at Christ's second coming.

See also
 Angel
 High priest
 Jesus Christ
 Moses
 Related Bible parts: Numbers 12, Numbers 14, Numbers 32, Deuteronomy 1, Deuteronomy 2, Psalm 95, Zechariah 6

References

Sources

External links
 King James Bible - Wikisource
English Translation with Parallel Latin Vulgate
Online Bible at GospelHall.org (ESV, KJV, Darby, American Standard Version, Bible in Basic English)
Multiple bible versions at Bible Gateway (NKJV, NIV, NRSV etc.)

03